San Vicente Creek (Spanish for "St. Vincent") is a  stream in San Diego County, California.

It rises east of Ramona and flows southwest through the Cuyamaca Mountains into the San Vicente Reservoir, and subsequently to its confluence with the San Diego River just north of Lakeside.

The West Branch San Vicente Creek flows  from the west until it reaches the San Vicente Reservoir.

See also
List of rivers of California

References

Rivers of San Diego County, California
San Diego River
Cuyamaca Mountains
Rivers of Southern California